Catherine E. Richardson (born February 21, 1969) is an American singer, songwriter, actress, and narrator from the Chicago suburbs in Illinois.  She is the lead singer for the band Jefferson Starship and her own Cathy Richardson Band, and has performed the Janis Joplin parts for Joplin's former band Big Brother and the Holding Company.

Biography
Richardson grew up in west suburban Burr Ridge, Illinois, and graduated from Hinsdale Central High School in Hinsdale, Illinois. Before starting her music career, Richardson worked as an auto mechanic and as a cashier at her father's gas station. She started her music career full-time in 1990. She was introduced to Jim Peterik who mentored her and helped with her first two albums. She has also co-written songs with Peterik, and is a fairly frequent guest in his all-star World Stage concerts.

Richardson appeared as a guest on Noggin's puppet series Jack's Big Music Show. In the pilot episode, she played the voice of one of the main characters.

The Cathy Richardson Band was voted Best Local Band in the Chicago Tribune readers poll of 1999 and best in WFLD's "Best & Worst of Chicago" viewer poll in November 2000.

She portrayed Janis Joplin in the 2001 original off-Broadway run of Love, Janis and much of the touring performances.  She also sang Janis' vocal parts for Big Brother and the Holding Company during many of their recent live shows.

In 2004, Richardson and art director Bill Dolan were nominated for the Grammy Award for Best Recording Package for the Cathy Richardson Band album The Road to Bliss.

In 2008, Richardson became the new vocalist for San Francisco band Jefferson Starship and appears on the 2008 release Jefferson's Tree of Liberty and as vocalist with Jefferson Starship on PBS's 2011 60s Pop, Rock & Soul television show, performing "White Rabbit" and "Somebody to Love".

Discography

Studio albums

 Moon, Not Banana (1993) Jessica Records
 Fools on a Tandem (1995) Jessica Records
 Snake Camp (1998) Bloody Nurse Records
 Buzzzed (2001) Bloody Nurse Records
 The Road to Bliss (2003) Cash Rich Records
 Delusions of Grandeur (2006) Cash Rich Records

Live album

 All Excess... Live @ The Park West (1996) Jessica Records

Compilation albums featuring tracks by Cathy Richardson

 Songs of Janis Joplin: Blues Down Deep (1997) House of Blues Records (song "Try Just a Little Bit Harder")
 Jim Peterik and World Stage (2000) Jim Peterik and Cathy Richardson (songs "Diamonds For Stones" and "From Here To Hereafter")
 Sweet Emotion: Songs of Aerosmith (2001) (song "Last Child")
 Here Come the Irish (2003) Written by John Scully and Jim Tullio, vocals by Cathy Richardson (Cathy is featured on the song "Here Come the Irish")
 Judgement Day, Songs of Robert Johnson (2004) (song "Preachin' Blues (Up Jumped the Devil)")
 Folksongs of Illinois, Vol. 4 (2011) (Cathy is featured on the Woody Guthrie song "Old Chy-Car-Go")

Download Only Single

 What I Am (2015) Chance Music (available through ITunes)

Side project albums and guest appearances

The Juleps
Cathy Richardson along with members of The Insiders
 Kickbutt City, USA (1998)

Joel Hoekstra
 Undefined (vocals on track "Spank Me") (2000)

Jefferson Starship
 Jefferson's Tree of Liberty (2008)
 Air Play (2011)
 Mother of the Sun (2020)

Macrodots
 The Other Side (2010)
 Macrodots Two (2015)

References

External links
 

Living people
Singers from Illinois
American women singers
American actresses
People from Burr Ridge, Illinois
Place of birth missing (living people)
Jefferson Starship members
1969 births
Big Brother and the Holding Company members
21st-century American women